Spray or spraying commonly refer to:

 Spray (liquid drop)
 Aerosol spray
 Blood spray
 Hair spray
 Nasal spray
 Pepper spray
 PAVA spray
 Road spray or tire spray, road debris kicked up from a vehicle tire
 Sea spray, refers to aerosol particles that form in the ocean
 Spraying, or the creation of a spray
 Spraying (animal behavior), the action of an animal marking its territory with urine
 The use of a spray bottle
 The use of a sprayer
 Aerial application of chemicals
 Spray painting

Spray or spraying may also refer to:

People
 Ruth Hinshaw Spray (1848-1929), American peace activist

Places
 Spray, North Carolina, a former mill town in Rockingham County, North Carolina, now part of Eden, North Carolina

Arts, entertainment, and media
 Spray (band), a British synthpop band
 Spray (video game), a 2008 video game for Nintendo's Wii video game console

Brands and enterprises
 Spray Network, a Swedish Internet company

Computing
 Heap spraying in a computer security exploit
 JIT spraying, a specialised version of the above

Ships
 Spray (sailing vessel), the ship used in Joshua Slocum's solo circumnavigation in the late 19th century
 USS Spray (ID-2491), a trawler in commission in the United States Navy from 1918 to 1919
 USS Spray II (SP-308), a motorboat ordered delivered to the United States Navy in 1917 for use as a patrol vessel but never taken over by the Navy

Other uses
 Spray (mathematics), a type of vector field in differential geometry defined on the tangent bundle of a manifold
 Spraying, using an automatic firearm in an attack

See also
 
 
 Gush (disambiguation)
 Spay (disambiguation)
 Spry (disambiguation)
 Spurt (disambiguation)
 Squirt (disambiguation)

pl:Spray